Mytona is a global group of companies specialising in video game development and publishing. Mytona is a company headquartered in New Zealand, formerly in Yakutsk (Russia).

History 
Mytona Group was founded in Yakutsk, in 2012 and currently has offices in Singapore, Kazakhstan, Armenia, Georgia and Serbia. Mytona is the creator of games such as Seekers Notes, Cooking Diary; and is the publisher of the PC game Propnight.

Seekers Notes 

In 2015 the company released a hidden object game titled Seekers Notes. It is a mystery game set in the town of Darkwood. Users play as the Seeker, the chosen one, the possessor of a powerful artefact — the Magical Map, and the aim is to save Darkwood from an evil curse. Seekers Notes is consistently present in TOP 30-50 Grossing USA iPad Games (the peak position is TOP-3).

Cooking Diary 

In 2018 Mytona released a time management game. In 2019 Cooking Diary  won "People's Choice Award" at the 15th International Mobile Gaming Awards. in San Francisco. In 2020 Cooking Diary won "People's Voice" at the Webby Awards 2020. In October 2020 Mytona collaborated with streaming service NETFLIX, resulting in the Cooking Diary x Stranger Things Halloween update.

New projects 
In 2020 Mytona released two new projects: Outfire (a multiplayer competitive top-down shooter) and Tasty Makeover (a match-3 game).

Propnight 

In 2021 the company published the 4v1 physics-based prop hunt survival Propnight a multiplayer game, for the developer Fntastic.

The Day Before 

Mytona is working with Fntastic on Steam MMO survival game The Day Before.

Mytonaverse 
At the end of 2021, the company announced that it plans to launch its own metaverse, called Mytonaverse, by mid-December 2021

References

External links 
  

Video game companies of New Zealand
Video game companies established in 2012
Metaverse
Video game publishers